Saline Township is an inactive township in Miller County, in the U.S. state of Missouri.

Saline Township took its name from Saline Creek.

References

Townships in Missouri
Townships in Miller County, Missouri